A mullion is a structural element which divides adjacent window units.

Mullion may also refer to:
 Mullion (geology), a geological term for structures formed by extension
 Mullion, Cornwall, a village and parish in Cornwall, England
 Mullion, New South Wales, a locality in Australia
 Mullion Cove, a harbour and cove in Cornwall, England
 Mullion Creek, New South Wales, a town in Australia
 Mullion Island, a small island in Mount's Bay, Cornwall, England
 Mullion School, in Mullion, Cornwall, England

People with the surname
 Annabel Mullion (born 1969), English actress